Statistics of Danish 1st Division in the 1918/1919 season.

Province tournament

First round
Boldklubben 1901 2–0 Korsør Boldklub
Odense Boldklub 2–1 Aarhus Gymnastikforening

Second round
Odense Boldklub 4–5 Boldklubben 1901

Copenhagen Championship

Danish Final
Akademisk Boldklub 3–0 Boldklubben 1901

References
Denmark – List of final tables (RSSSF)

1918–19 in Danish football
Top level Danish football league seasons
Denmark